The Goose, formerly The Blue Goose, is a New Mexican, Southwestern, and Tex-Mex restaurant in southeast Portland, Oregon, United States.

Description
The Goose is a 52-seat New Mexican, Southwestern, and Tex-Mex restaurant at the intersection of Southeast 28th Avenue and Ankeny Street in southeast Portland's Buckman neighborhood. The menu features adobada, carne asada, chile con queso with chorizo, a cheeseburger with green chiles, chile rellenos, enchiladas, and tacos, as well as in-house smoked meats and handmade tortillas. The drink menu features margaritas, Mexican beers, a wide selection of tequilas, wine, and other cocktails with agave. The restaurant's interior has turquoise-colored decor.

History

The building currently housing The Goose previously served as a tavern called The Blue Goose. In addition to drinks, the business served hard-boiled eggs and sold eggs by the dozen. The building housed the Tex-Mex restaurant Esparza's from 1990 to 2014. The current restaurant was opened by Kristine Craine on June 7, 2014. Some of Esparza's interior features, including the bar, were repurposed for The Blue Goose. Matthew Stauss served as the restaurant's first chef. The restaurant's name was later changed to simply The Goose.

Reception

In his review of the restaurant shortly after opening, Ben Waterhouse of The Oregonian wrote, "The vibe is more new-West saloon than colorful cantina, with Esparza's bright panels and constellation of bric-a-brac replaced with stained plywood and earth tones. Cattle skulls with lightbulbs in their eye sockets add a zany touch. Service is pleasant and attentive." He later included The Blue Goose's cheeseburger in his "definitive guide to Portland's best green chile cheeseburgers", calling it the "best-tasting version we found". The Oregonian Michael Russell included The Goose in his 2015 list of the best restaurants in southeast Portland. The newspaper's Colin Powers called The Goose's food "enchanting" and included the restaurant in his 2015 overview of Portland's best margaritas. He said the restaurant offers the "best menu of flavored margaritas". In 2016, Willamette Week said, "The Goose's mountains of New Mexican excess are so unabashedly American they make Guy Fieri look like Vlad Putin." In 2019, Alex Frane included The Goose in Eater Portland list of "Portland's most enticing margaritas".

See also
 Hispanics and Latinos in Portland, Oregon
 List of Tex-Mex restaurants

References

External links

 
 
 
 

2014 establishments in Oregon
Buckman, Portland, Oregon
Cuisine of the Southwestern United States
Mexican-American culture in Portland, Oregon
New Mexican cuisine
Restaurants established in 2014
Restaurants in Portland, Oregon
Tex-Mex restaurants